The 2011–12 Georgian Cup (also known as the David Kipiani Cup) was the sixty-eighth season overall and the twenty-second since independence of the Georgian annual football tournament. The competition began on 17 August 2011 and ended with the final in May 2012. The defending champions were Gagra. The winner of the competition, Dila Gori, qualified for the second qualifying round of the 2012–13 UEFA Europa League.

Dinamo, Zestafoni, Metalurgi and Gagra, the 4 clubs participating in the European club tournaments, joined the competition at the quarter final stage.

Round of 32
The participating teams were divided into two zones according to territories - East and West.
The first matches were held on 17 August. The return matches were held on 13 and 14 September.

East 

|}

First Legs

Second Legs

West 

|}

First Legs

Second Legs

Round of 16
The 12 winners from the previous round competed in this round, as well as the four teams that finished first, second, third and cup winner in last year's Umaglesi Liga, Zestafoni, Dinamo Tbilisi, Metalurgi Rustavi and Gagra.
The first matches will be held on 28 September. The return matches will be held on 2 November.

|}

First Legs

Second Legs

Quarterfinals
The eight winners from the previous round played in this round. The first matches will be held on 24 November. The return matches will be held on 7 December.

|}

First Legs

Second Legs

Semifinals
The four winners from the previous round will play in this round. The first matches will be held on 10 April 2012. The return matches will be held on 18 April 2012.

|}

First Legs

Second Legs

Final

See also 
 2011–12 Umaglesi Liga
 2011–12 Pirveli Liga

References

External links
 Official site 

Georgian Cup seasons
Cup
Georgian Cup